Mark Anthony Stewart. (born October 13, 1959) is an American football coach and former linebacker. He played college football at Washington from 1979 to 1982. He then played in the National Football League (NFL) for 2 seasons from 1983 to 1984 for the Minnesota Vikings.

Playing career
A native of San Jose, California, Camden High School, sprinter 9.6 (100yd), 1977 Central Coast Section 220yd champion (21.6). A first-team All-American at outside linebacker, Stewart was one of the top defensive players to step on the gridiron at the University of Washington. In 1982, he set school records for quarterback sacks in a game with five against UCLA and fumbles caused in a season with five. Stewart registered the third-most solo tackles in a single game with 15 against the Bruins and his ten sacks that season ranks fifth in the school record books. Stewart was an academic all-district and academic all-Pac-10 selection as a senior as well as a team captain. He was drafted in the fifth round (127th overall) of the 1983 NFL Draft, and played linebacker with the Minnesota Vikings for two years, where he appeared in four games.

Coaching career
In 2000, he took over the Meadowdale High School football team, which was winless the previous season. Under his leadership, the Meadowdale team went to state in 2007, the first time since 1979. He has also coached at Mercer Island High School, Renton High School, Garfield High School, Highline High School and Western Washington University. He currently coaches football for Mariner High School in Everett, Washington.

On November 14, 2008, Mark Stewart was inducted into the University of Washington Football Hall of Fame.

In 2022 he became the running backs coach for the Michigan Panthers of the United States Football League (USFL). On March 15, 2023, the Panthers announced that Stewart would not return as the running backs coach for the 2023 season.

See also
 Washington Huskies football statistical leaders

References

1959 births
Living people
American football linebackers
Minnesota Vikings players
Washington Huskies football players
Western Washington Vikings football coaches
High school football coaches in Washington (state)
Sportspeople from Palo Alto, California
Players of American football from San Jose, California
Michigan Panthers (2022) coaches